The women's 400 metres event at the 1997 Summer Universiade was held on 28, 29 and 30 August at the Stadio Cibali in Catania, Italy.

Medalists

Results

Heats

Semifinals

Final

References

Athletics at the 1997 Summer Universiade
1997 in women's athletics
1997